José Luis de Frutos (18 September 1949 – 26 June 2006) was a Spanish judoka. He competed in the men's middleweight event at the 1976 Summer Olympics.

References

1949 births
2006 deaths
Spanish male judoka
Olympic judoka of Spain
Judoka at the 1976 Summer Olympics
Sportspeople from Madrid